Zernsdorf station is a railway station in the Zernsdorf district in the municipality of Königs Wusterhausen, located in the Dahme-Spreewald district in Brandenburg, Germany.

References

Railway stations in Brandenburg
Buildings and structures in Dahme-Spreewald